Ashley Hammond (born 27 September 1969) is an Australian cricketer. He played in two first-class matches for South Australia in 1992/93.

See also
 List of South Australian representative cricketers

References

External links
 

1969 births
Living people
Australian cricketers
South Australia cricketers
Cricketers from Adelaide